Portrait of Adele Bloch-Bauer I (also called The Lady in Gold or The Woman in Gold) is a painting by Gustav Klimt, completed between 1903 and 1907. The portrait was commissioned by the sitter's husband, a Jewish banker and sugar producer. The painting was stolen by the Nazis in 1941 and displayed at the Österreichische Galerie Belvedere in Vienna. The portrait is the final and most fully representative work of Klimt's golden phase. It was the first of two depictions of Adele by Klimt—the second was completed in 1912; these were two of several works by the artist that the family owned.

Adele died in 1925; her will asked that the artworks by Klimt be left to the Galerie Belvedere after Ferdinand's death, although these belonged to Ferdinand, not to Adele. Following the 1938 Anschluss of Austria by Nazi Germany, Ferdinand fled Vienna's increasingly anti-Jewish persecutions, and made his way to Switzerland, leaving behind much of his wealth, including his large art collection. The painting was stolen by the Nazis in 1941, along with the remainder of Ferdinand's assets, after a charge of tax evasion was made against him. The assets raised from the purported sales of artwork, property and his sugar business were offset against the tax claim. The lawyer acting on behalf of the German state gave the portrait to the Galerie Belvedere, claiming he was following the wishes Adele had made in her will. Ferdinand died in 1945; his will stated that his estate should go to his nephew and two nieces.

In 1998 Hubertus Czernin, the Austrian investigative journalist, established that the Galerie Belvedere contained several works stolen from Jewish owners in the war, and that the gallery had refused to return the art to their original owners, or to acknowledge a theft had taken place. One of Ferdinand's nieces, Maria Altmann, hired the lawyer E. Randol Schoenberg to make a claim against the gallery for the return of five works by Klimt. In 2006 after a seven-year legal claim, which included a hearing in front of the Supreme Court of the United States, an arbitration committee in Vienna agreed that the painting, and others, had been stolen from the family and that it should be returned to Altmann. She sold it the same year for $135 million, at the time a record price for a painting to the businessman and art collector Ronald Lauder, who placed the work in the Neue Galerie, the New York-based gallery he co-founded.

Background

Gustav Klimt
Gustav Klimt was born in 1862 in Baumgarten, near Vienna in Austria-Hungary. He attended the Vienna School of Arts and Crafts (German: Kunstgewerbeschule Wien) before taking on commissions with his brother, Ernst, and a fellow-student Franz von Matsch from 1879.

During the 1890s he was influenced by European avant-garde art, including the works of the painters Fernand Khnopff, Jan Toorop and Aubrey Beardsley. In 1897 he was a founding member and president of the Vienna Secession, a group of artists who wanted to break with what they saw as the prevailing conservatism of the Viennese . By 1900 he was the preferred portrait painter of the wives of the largely Jewish Viennese bourgeoisie, an emerging class of self-made industrialists who were "buying the innovative new art that state museums rejected", according to the journalist Anne-Marie O'Connor.

From 1898 Klimt began to experiment with the style in what became known as his Byzantine or Golden period, when his works, stylistically influenced by Art Nouveau and the Arts and Crafts movement, were gilded with gold leaf. Klimt had begun using gold in his 1890 portrait of the pianist Joseph Pembauer, but his first work that included a golden theme was Pallas Athene (1898). The art historian Gilles Néret considers that the use of gold in the painting "underlines the essential erotic ingredient in ... [Klimt's] view of the world". Néret also states that Klimt used the gold to give subjects a sacred or magical quality.

Ferdinand and Adele Bloch-Bauer

 was from a wealthy Jewish Viennese family. Her father was a director of the Wiener Bankverein, the seventh largest bank in Austria-Hungary, and the general director of the Oriental Railway. In the late 1890s Adele met Klimt, and may have begun a relationship with him. Opinion is divided on whether Adele and Klimt had an affair. The artist Catherine Dean considered that Adele was "the only society lady painted by Klimt who is known definitely to be his mistress", while the journalist Melissa Müller and the academic Monica Tatzkow write that "no evidence has ever been produced that their relationship was more than a friendship". The author Frank Whitford observes that some of the preliminary sketches that Klimt made for The Kiss showed a bearded figure which was possibly a self-portrait; the female partner is described by Whitford as an "idealised portrait of Adele". Whitford writes that the only evidence put forward to support the theory is the position of the woman's right hand, as Adele had a disfigured finger following a childhood accident.

Adele's parents arranged a marriage with Ferdinand Bloch, a banker and sugar manufacturer; Adele's older sister had previously married Ferdinand's older brother. Ferdinand was older than his fiancée and at the time of the marriage in December 1899, she was 18 and he was 35. The couple, who had no children, both changed their surnames to Bloch-Bauer. Socially well-connected, Adele brought together writers, politicians and intellectuals for regular salons at their home.

The couple shared a love of art, and patronised several artists, collecting primarily nineteenth-century Viennese paintings and modern sculpture. Ferdinand also had a passion for neoclassical porcelain, and by 1934 his collection was over 400 pieces and one of the finest in the world.

In 1901 Klimt painted Judith and the Head of Holofernes; the art historian Gottfried Fliedl observes that the painting is "widely known and interpreted as Salome". Adele was the model for the work, and wore a heavily jewelled deep choker given to her by Ferdinand, in what Whitford describes as "Klimt's most erotic painting". Whitford also writes that the painting displays "apparent evidence of ... cuckoldry". In 1903 Ferdinand purchased his first Klimt work from the artist, Buchenwald (Beech Forest).

The painting

Preparation and execution

In mid-1903 Ferdinand Bloch-Bauer commissioned Klimt to paint a portrait of his wife; he wished to give the piece to Adele's parents as an anniversary present that October. Klimt drew over a hundred preparatory sketches for the portrait between 1903 and 1904. The Bloch-Bauers purchased some of the sketches he had made of Adele when they obtained 16 Klimt drawings. In December 1903, along with fellow artist Maximilian Lenz, Klimt visited the Basilica of San Vitale in Ravenna where he studied the early-Christian Byzantine gold ground mosaics of Justinian I and his wife, Empress Theodora. Lenz later wrote that "the mosaics made an immense decisive impression on ... [Klimt]. From this comes the resplendence, the stiff decoration of his art". Klimt later said that the "mosaics of unbelievable splendour" were a "revelation" to him. The Ravenna mosaics also attracted the attention of other artists who provided illustrations of the work, including Wassily Kandinsky in 1911 and Clive Bell in 1914.

Klimt undertook more extensive preparations for the portrait than any other piece he worked on.  Much of the portrait was undertaken by an elaborate technique of using gold and silver leaf and then adding decorative motifs in bas-relief using gesso, a paint mixture consisting of a binder mixed with chalk or gypsum. The frame for the painting, covered in gold leaf, was made by the architect Josef Hoffmann. Klimt finished the work by 1907.

Description

The painting measures ; it is composed of oil paint and silver and gold leaf on canvas. The portrait shows Adele Bloch-Bauer sitting on a golden throne or chair, in front of a golden starry background. Around her neck is the same jewelled choker Klimt included in the Judith painting. She wears a tight golden dress in a triangular shape, made up of rectilinear forms. In places the dress merges into the background so much so that the museum curator Jan Thompson writes that "one comes across the model almost by accident, so enveloped is she in the thick geometric scheme". Peter Vergo, writing for Grove Art, considers that the painting "marks the height of ... [Klimt's] gold-encrusted manner of painting".

Adele's hair, face, décolletage and hands are painted in oil; they make up less than a twelfth of the work and, in Whitford's opinion, convey little about the sitter's character. For Whitford the effect of the gold background is to "remove Adele Bloch-Bauer from the earthly plane, transform the flesh and blood into an apparition from a dream of sensuality and self-indulgence"; he, and Thomson, consider the work to look more like a religious icon than a secular portrait. O'Connor writes that the painting "seem[s] to embody femininity", and thus likens it to the Mona Lisa, while for Müller and Tatzkow, the gold gives the effect that Adele appears "melancholy and vulnerable, unapproachably aloof and yet rapt".

Both the current holder of the portrait—the Neue Galerie New York—and the art historian Elana Shapira describe how the background and gown contain symbols suggestive of erotica, including triangles, eggs, shapes of eyes and almonds. Also present are decorative motifs on the theme of the letters A and B, the sitter's initials. Whitford identifies influences of the art of the Byzantine, Egypt, Mycenae and Greece, describing that "the gold is like that in Byzantine mosaics; the eyes on the dress are Egyptian, the repeated coils and whorls Mycenaean, while other decorative devices, based on the initial letters of the sitter's name, are vaguely Greek".

Reception

Klimt exhibited his portrait at the 1907 Mannheim International Art Show, alongside the Portrait of Fritza Riedler (1906). Many of the critics had negative reactions to the two paintings, describing them as "mosaic-like wall-grotesqueries", "bizarre", "absurdities" and "vulgarities".

The unnamed reviewer from the Wiener Allgemeine Zeitung described the painting as "an idol in a golden shrine", while the critic Eduard Pötzl described the work as "" ("more brass than Bloch"). According to the art historian Tobias G. Natter, some critics disapproved of the loss of the sitter's individuality, while others "accused Klimt of endangering the autonomy of art".

History and ownership

1912–1945

In 1912 Ferdinand commissioned a second painting of his wife, in which "the erotic charge of the likeness of 1907 has been spent", according to Whitford. In February 1918, Klimt suffered a stroke and was hospitalised; he caught pneumonia due to the worldwide influenza epidemic and died that month.

On 19 January 1923 Adele Bloch-Bauer wrote a will. Ferdinand's brother Gustav, a lawyer by training, helped her frame the document and was named as the executor. The will included a reference to the Klimt works owned by the couple, including the two portraits of her:

(Translates from the German as: "I ask my husband after his death to leave my two portraits and the four landscapes by Gustav Klimt to the Austrian State Gallery in Vienna.")

In February 1925 Adele died of meningitis. Shortly afterwards Gustav filed for probate; he included a document that stated that the clause in the will was precatory, i.e. a request rather than a binding testament. He added that Ferdinand had said he would honour the clause, even though he, not Adele, was the legal owner of the paintings. The works by Klimt which Ferdinand owned, including the two portraits, were moved to Adele's bedroom as a shrine to her. The painting was lent for an exhibition at the Vienna Secession in 1928 to mark the tenth anniversary of Klimt's death; in 1934 it was displayed in London as part of the Austria in London exhibition. In 1936 Ferdinand gave Schloss Kammer am Attersee III to the Österreichische Galerie Belvedere; he later acquired a further Klimt painting, the Portrait of Amalie Zuckerkandl (1917–1918). In 1937 the golden portrait of Adele was lent for display at the Paris Exposition.

In December 1937 Gustav's daughter–and Ferdinand's niece–Maria, married the young opera singer Fritz Altman. Ferdinand gave her Adele's jewelled choker as a wedding present. Ferdinand left Vienna for his Czechoslovakian castle in March 1938, following the Anschluss of Austria by Nazi Germany. That autumn, following the Munich Agreement, he realised he was not safe and left for Paris. In September the following year, he moved to neutral Switzerland where he lived in a hotel. In his absence the Nazi regime falsely accused him of evading taxes of 1.4 million Reichsmarks. His assets were frozen and, in May 1938, a seizure order was issued that allowed the state to dispose of his property as they felt fit. His sugar factory was confiscated and turned over to the state, and went through a process of Aryanisation as Jewish shareholders and managers were replaced.

As part of the process to deal with the purported tax evasion, the Nazi lawyer Friedrich Führer was appointed as the administrator of the estate. In January 1939 he convened a meeting of museum and gallery directors to inspect the works and to give an indication of which they would like to obtain. After the collection was catalogued, Adolf Hitler used the  decree to obtain part of the collection at a reduced price. Göring also used the  decree to obtain the jewelled choker that had been given to Maria Altmann; it was given as a gift to Emmy, his wife.

In December 1941 Führer transferred the paintings Portrait of Adele Bloch-Bauer I and Apfelbaum I to the Galerie Belvedere in return for Schloss Kammer am Attersee III, which he then sold to Gustav Ucicky, an illegitimate son of Klimt. A note accompanying the paintings stated he was acting in accordance with Adele's will. To remove all reference to its Jewish subject matter, the gallery renamed the portrait with the German title  (translates as Lady in Gold).

1945–present
In August 1945 Ferdinand wrote a final will that revoked all previous ones. It made no reference to the pictures, which he thought had been lost forever, but it stated that his entire estate was left to his nephew and two nieces—one of whom was Maria Altmann. Ferdinand died in Switzerland in November that year.

In 1946 the Austrian state issued an Annulment Act that declared all transactions motivated by Nazi discrimination were void; any Jews who wanted to remove artwork from Austria were forced to give some of their works to Austrian museums in order to obtain an export permit for others. The Bloch-Bauer family hired Dr Gustav Rinesh, a Viennese lawyer, to reclaim stolen artwork on their behalf. Using the records produced by Führer, he traced most of the works to the Galerie Belvedere, and Häuser in Unterach, to Führer's own private collection. Several works were returned to the Bloch-Bauer estate, but no Klimt paintings; to obtain the necessary export permits, the family were forced to let the Austrian state retain Häuser in Unterach am Attersee, Adele Bloch-Bauer I, Adele Bloch-Bauer II, and Apfelbaum I. They were also forced to relinquish any claims on Buchenwald and Schloss Kammer am Attersee III. The Galerie Belvedere based its claim of retention of the Klimt works on Adele's will.

In 1998 the Austrian government introduced the Art Restitution Act, which looked again at the question of art stolen by the Nazis. The government formed a restitution committee to report on which works should be returned; government archives were opened up to research into the provenance of works held by the government. Hubertus Czernin, the Austrian investigative journalist, undertook extensive research in the newly opened archives and published a story about the theft of art by the Nazis; with the subsequent refusal of the Austrian state to return the art or to acknowledge a theft had taken place, Czernin described the situation as "a double crime".

Altmann, then living in the US, hired E. Randol Schoenberg to act on her behalf. Schoenberg was the son of a woman she had been friends with since they lived in Vienna. They filed a claim with the restitution committee for the return of six paintings: Adele Bloch-Bauer I, Adele Bloch-Bauer II, Apfelbaum I, Buchenwald, Häuser in Unterach am Attersee and Amalie Zuckerkandl. The committee turned down the request, again citing Adele's will as the reason they were retaining the works. The committee's decision recommended that 16 Klimt drawings and 19 pieces of porcelain that had been held by Ferdinand and Adele and which were still at the Galerie Belvedere should be returned, as they fell outside the request of the will.

In March 2000 Altmann filed a civil claim against the Austrian government for the return of the paintings. She was informed that the cost of filing (consisting of 1.2% of the amount in question, plus a filing fee), would have meant a fee of €1.75 million. To avoid the prohibitively high costs, Altmann and Schoenberg sued the Austrian government and the Galerie Belvedere in the US courts. The Austrian government filed for dismissal, with arguments based on the Foreign Sovereign Immunities Act (1976). The Act granted immunity to sovereign nations except under certain conditions. Schoenberg showed that three of the conditions pertinent to the case were that Altmann's property had been taken in violation of international law; the property was in the possession of the state in question, or one of its agencies; and that the property had been used on a commercial basis in the US. Over four years of litigation followed as to whether the case could be brought against a sovereign state before it was brought before the Supreme Court in Republic of Austria v. Altmann. In June 2004 the Supreme Court determined that the paintings had been stolen and that Austria was not immune from a claim from Altmann; the court made no comment on the current ownership of the paintings.

To avoid returning to the courts in what could have been lengthy litigation process, arbitration in Austria was agreed upon by both parties, although the Austrians had turned down such a move in 1999. Three arbitrators formed the panel, Andreas Nödl, Walter Rechberger and Peter Rummel. Schoenberg gave evidence before them in September 2005 and, in January 2006, they delivered their judgement. They stated that five of the six paintings in question should be returned to the Bloch-Bauer estate, as outlined in Ferdinand's will; only the Portrait of Amalie Zuckerkandl was to be retained by the gallery.

After the panel's decision was announced, the Galerie Belvedere ran a series of advertisements that appeared in bus stops and on underground railway platforms. The posters said "Ciao Adele", advertising the last opportunity before the painting left the country and long queues formed around the block. Although there were calls from some Austrians for the state to purchase the five paintings, the government stated that the price would be too high to justify the expense. The paintings were exported from Austria in March 2006 and exhibited together at the Los Angeles County Museum of Art from April to June that year.

When Altmann was asked what she wanted to do with the paintings, she stated "I would not want any private person to buy these paintings, ... It is very meaningful to me that they are seen by anybody who wants to see them, because that would have been the wish of my aunt." In June 2006 the Portrait of Adele Bloch-Bauer I was sold to Ronald Lauder for $135 million for his public art museum, at the time a record price for a painting. Eileen Kinsella, the editor of ARTnews, considered the high price was due to several factors, particularly the painting's provenance, the increasing demand for Austrian Expressionism, rising prices in the art world and "Lauder's passion for and pursuit of this particular work". Lauder placed the work in the Neue Galerie, the New York-based gallery he co-founded. The painting has been on display at the location since. 

Michael Kimmelman, the chief art critic for the New York Times, was critical of the sale, and wrote that "A story about justice and redemption after the Holocaust has devolved into yet another tale of the crazy, intoxicating art market." Altmann said of the sale that it was not practical for her, or her relatives who were also part of the estate, to retain any of the paintings. In November 2006 the remaining four Klimt paintings were sold at Christie's auction house. Adele Bloch-Bauer II sold for $87.9 million, Apfelbaum I for $33 million, Buchenwald for $40.3 million and Häuser in Unterach am Attersee for $31 million. All went to private collections.

Legacy
The history of the Portrait of Adele Bloch-Bauer I and the other paintings taken from the Bloch-Bauers has been recounted in three documentary films, Stealing Klimt (2007), The Rape of Europa (2007) and Adele's Wish (2008). The painting's history is described in the 2012 book The Lady in Gold: The Extraordinary Tale of Gustav Klimt's Masterpiece, Portrait of Adele Bloch-Bauer, by the journalist Anne-Marie O'Connor. The history, as well as other stories of other stolen art, is told by Melissa Müller and Monika Tatzkow in Lost Lives, Lost Art: Jewish Collectors, Nazi Art Theft, and the Quest for Justice, published in 2010. The story of Adele Bloch-Bauer and Maria Altmann formed the basis for the 2017 novel Stolen Beauty by Laurie Lico Albanese. The portrait is featured in the memoir of Gregor Collins, The Accidental Caregiver, about his relationship with Maria Altmann, published in August 2012. The book was dramatised for the stage in January 2015. In 2015, Altmann's story was dramatised for the film Woman in Gold starring Helen Mirren as Maria and Ryan Reynolds as Schoenberg.

Altmann died in February 2011, aged 94. Schoenberg, who had worked on a 40 per cent conditional fee throughout, received $54 million for the sale of Portrait of Adele Bloch-Bauer I and $55 million for the sale of the remaining four paintings. After he donated over $7 million for the building of the new premises of the Los Angeles Museum of the Holocaust, he said that he had "tried to do good things with the money". He subsequently specialised in the restitution of artwork plundered by the Nazis.

Elements of the portrait have been noted by art critics to have influenced the painting First Lady Michelle Obama, by Amy Sherald in 2018.

See also
 Art repatriation
 List of most expensive paintings

Notes and references

Explanatory notes

Citations

General and cited sources

Books

Journals and newspapers

Internet and television media

External links

 Stealingklimt.com
 Fortune article by Tyler Green about Ronald Lauder and the Neue Galerie's acquisition of the painting.
 Austrian Arbitral Award, "Maria V. Altmann and others v. Republic of Austria", 6 May 2006. 

1907 paintings
20th-century portraits
Arts set in Austria
Jews and Judaism in Vienna
Nazi-looted art
Adele Bloch-Bauer I
Paintings in the collection of the Neue Galerie New York
Paintings on gold backgrounds
Portraits by Austrian artists
Portraits of women